The Legends Drum & Bugle Corps is an Open Class competitive junior drum and bugle corps. Based in Kalamazoo, Michigan.  Legends performs in Drum Corps International (DCI) competitions.

History
What is now the Legends Drum and Bugle Corps had its beginnings in Portage, Michigan in 2001 as an indoor winter brass and percussion ensemble at Portage Central High School.

The unit added a color guard in 2006 and performed in exhibition at several DCI shows that summer and the next.

Legends entered DCI competition in 2008, making semifinals and placing 15th of 23 corps at the DCI Open Class Championships at Michigan City, Indiana.

The corps gained the Open Class Finals in 2009, placing 10th and earning awards for Most Improved Corps, Most Outstanding Drum Major (Kelly Koch), and Open Class Director of the Year.

The corps has since remained as an Open Class finalist and has won additional awards as Most Improved Corps and for Most Outstanding Drum Major.

In 2015, Legends placed 5th at the DCI Open Class Championships and 25th overall at the DCI World Championships in Indianapolis, Indiana, and earning their first semifinals spot in their 10th Anniversary season. The corps was again named the Most Improved Open Class corps, and corps director Ibe Sodawalla received the 2015 Dr. David Kampschroer Leadership Award as Open Class Director of the Year.

2016 was the year the corps broke top 3 in DCI Open Class Championships and earned their highest score to date. Again, Legends made it to semifinals, this year earning 24th place. Noah Koch of Legends also won the Jim Jones Leadership Award for DCI Open Class Drum Major of the Year.

On November 17, 2022, Legends announced that the corps would go inactive for the 2023 season, citing increasing costs of touring that the corps was unable to meet.

Sponsorship
Legends Drum & Bugle Corps is sponsored by the Legends Performing Arts Association, a registered non-profit 501(c)(3) musical organization. The corps director is Ibe Sodawalla. The organization continues to support the original Portage Central High School Indoor Performance Ensemble. It also sponsored Legends Percussion, an indoor percussion ensemble that competes in Winter Guard International. Legends Percussion was inactive for the 2017 Winter Guard International season.

Show summary (2006–2022) 

Source:

References

External links
 Official website

Drum Corps International Open Class corps
Musical groups established in 2001
2001 establishments in Michigan